Yolanda (1175 – August 1219), often called Yolanda of Flanders, was Empress of the Latin Empire in Constantinople, first as the wife of Emperor Peter from 1216 to 1217 and thereafter as regent until her death in 1219. Peter was captured and imprisoned before he could reach Constantinople, so Yolanda assumed the duties of governing the Empire. She was ruling Marchioness of Namur from 1212 until 1217.

Biography
Yolanda was the daughter of Baldwin V, Count of Hainault, and Countess Margaret I of Flanders. Two of her brothers, Baldwin I and then Henry, were emperors in Constantinople. 

In 1212, Yolanda became Marchioness of Namur after her brother, Marquis Philip I. 

After the death of her brother emperor Henry in 1216 there was a brief period without an emperor, before Peter was elected to succeed her brother.  On their way there, Peter sent Yolanda ahead to Constantinople, while he fought the Despotate of Epirus, during which he was captured.  Because his fate was unknown (although he was probably killed), Yolanda governed Constantinople as a sole ruler for two years.  

She allied with the Bulgarians against the various Byzantine successor states, and was able to make peace with Theodore I Lascaris of the Empire of Nicaea, who married her daughter, Marie. She died soon after in 1219.

Legacy
Following Yolanda's death, her second son, Robert of Courtenay, became emperor because her oldest son, Philip, did not want the throne. Robert was still in France at the time.

Yolanda was, in her own right, Marchioness of Namur, which she inherited from her brother, Marquis Philip I, in 1212 and left to her eldest son, Marquis Philip II, when she went to Constantinople in 1216.

Issue
By Peter of Courtenay she had 10 children:
 Philip (d. 1226), Marquis of Namur, who declined the offer of the crown of the Latin Empire
 Robert of Courtenay (d. 1228), Latin Emperor
 Henry (d. 1229), Marquis of Namur
 Baldwin II of Constantinople (d. 1273)
 Margaret, Marchioness of Namur, who married first Raoul d'Issoudun and then Henry count of Vianden
 Elizabeth, who married Walter (Gaucher) count of Bar and then Eudes sire of Montagu
 Yolanda, who married Andrew II of Hungary
 Eleanor, who married Philip of Montfort, Lord of Tyre
 Marie, who married Theodore I Lascaris of the Empire of Nicaea
 Agnes, who married Geoffrey II Villehardouin, Prince of Achaea

References

Sources

1175 births
1219 deaths
13th-century Latin Emperors of Constantinople
House of Hainaut
Capetian House of Courtenay
Regents of the Latin Empire
Latin Empresses of Constantinople
Margraves of Namur
Women of the Crusader states
Flanders
13th-century Byzantine women
13th-century women rulers
13th-century rulers in Europe
12th-century women from the county of Flanders